Alric Arnett (born June 26, 1987) is a former American football wide receiver who played in the Arena Football League and Canadian Football League. He played for the Orlando Predators and Calgary Stampeders. He played college football for the West Virginia Mountaineers.

References

1987 births
Living people
American football wide receivers
Canadian football wide receivers
Orlando Predators players
Calgary Stampeders players
West Virginia Mountaineers football players
People from Belle Glade, Florida
Players of American football from Florida